The 1988 IAAF World Cross Country Championships was held in Auckland, New Zealand, at the Ellerslie Racecourse on March 26, 1988. A report on the event was given in the Glasgow Herald.

Complete results for men, junior men, women, medallists, 
 and the results of British athletes were published.

Medallists

Race results

Senior men's race (12 km)

Note: Athletes in parentheses did not score for the team result

Junior men's race (8.031 km)

†:Cosmas Ndeti of  finished 2nd in 23:31 min, but was disqualified.

Note: Athletes in parentheses did not score for the team result

Senior women's race (5.962 km)

Note: Athletes in parentheses did not score for the team result

Medal table (unofficial)

Note: Totals include both individual and team medals, with medals in the team competition counting as one medal.

Participation
An unofficial count yields the participation of 4401 athletes from 41 countries, two athletes (senior men) less than the official number published.

 (13)
 (2)
 (7)
 (20)
 (1)
 (10)
 (11)
 (19)
 (6)
 (5)
 (10)
 (14)
 (16)
 (10)
 (15)
 (6)
 (1)
 (14)
 (18)
 (2)
 (20)
 (20)
 (21)
 (1)
 (3)
 (15)
 (21)
 (15)
 (2)
 (16)
 (6)
 (21)
 (6)
 (7)
 (21)
 (21)
 (4)
 (4)
 (11)
 (4)
 (2)

See also
 1988 IAAF World Cross Country Championships – Senior men's race
 1988 IAAF World Cross Country Championships – Junior men's race
 1988 IAAF World Cross Country Championships – Senior women's race
 1988 in athletics (track and field)

References

External links
The World Cross Country Championships 1973-2005
GBRathletics

 
World Athletics Cross Country Championships
Iaaf
C
International athletics competitions hosted by New Zealand
Sport in Auckland
Cross country running in New Zealand
March 1988 sports events in New Zealand